This is a list of Nebraska Cornhuskers football players in the NFL Draft.

Nebraska had at least one player drafted every year from 1962 to 2018, a streak that was snapped in 2019. Two Huskers have been selected first overall (Sam Francis in 1937 and Irving Fryar in 1984), and one was selected last (Stan Hegener in 1975).

Key

Selections

Supplemental Drafts
No Nebraska player has been selected as a standalone supplemental draft pick since the rule's inception in 1977.

Three former Cornhuskers were drafted in the 1984 NFL Supplemental Draft of USFL and CFL players:

CFL Drafts
The Canadian Football League (CFL), though a separate league, is the only other major gridiron football league that currently drafts competitively against the NFL. Only players of Canadian citizenship or otherwise 'non-import' status are eligible to be drafted in the CFL's Canadian College Draft.

References

Nebraska

Nebraska Cornhuskers NFL Draft